Ah Beng is a pejorative term applied to describe an anti-social lower-class youth in Singapore who displays common characteristics such as having dyed hair, wearing loud fashion, playing loud music in public and being less educated. The female equivalent of an Ah Beng is an Ah Lian.

A stereotypical Ah Beng would be someone who is not highly educated, is loud and unsophisticated, and operates within secret societies and street gangs. Ah Lians, on the other hand, are regarded as bimbos, and are stereotyped as anti-intellectual, superficial, materialistic, and shallow.

The equivalent of an Ah Beng in other English-speaking countries is often attributed to Australia's bogans, the United States' rednecks and Britain's chavs.

Etymology
Ah Beng comes from the romanisation of the Singaporean Hokkien pronunciation of 阿明. The character "明" is commonly used in the names of ethnic Chinese males in the region; the term "Ah Beng" alludes to their commonness. 

Among Cantonese speakers, Ah Beng is also known as lala zai (啦啦仔). "Lala" has no actual meaning in itself, although it may have originated from the Singlish word "la"/"lah", while "zai" means "boy." "Lala zai" refers to individuals who speak in "pure" Singlish and who possess a strong preference for gaudy fashions or hairstyles.

In popular culture 
Ah Bengs have been featured in several Singaporean films, including:
S11 (2006) — A film about three Singaporeans whose lives coincide. 

The stereotypical Ah Beng was the title character Phua Chu Kang in the sitcom Phua Chu Kang Pte Ltd, played by Gurmit Singh. In the show, Chu Kang's brother, Phua Chu Beng, is nicknamed Ah Beng, despite being an articulate, educated architect, the complete antithesis of an Ah Beng.

See also

Hikikomori
NEET

In other countries

Notes

References
Wong Kim Hoh, "Who Says Ah Bengs Cannot Make It?", The Straits Times (2 April 2006)
Samuel Lee, "Hitting the Right Notes", The Straits Times (21 April 2006)
from the Coxford Singlish Dictionary
from A Dictionary of Singlish and Singapore English

External links
Ah Beng and Ah Lian

Singlish
Southern Min words and phrases
Singaporean culture
Class-related slurs
Social class subcultures
Socioeconomic stereotypes